NorthPark Center, sometimes referred to as NorthPark Mall, is an upscale, enclosed shopping mall in Dallas, Texas (United States). It is at the intersection of Loop 12 
(Northwest Highway) and US 75 (North Central Expressway). Opened in 1965, it now has over 235 stores and restaurants and annual sales of over $1 billion. It is at present, the 20th-largest shopping mall in the country. Its anchors include Nordstrom, Macy's (formerly Foley's), Dillard's, Neiman Marcus, AMC Theatres, and Eataly.

History

In the early 1960s, developer Raymond Nasher leased a  cotton field on the edge of Dallas and hired E.G Hamilton of Harrell+Hamilton Architects. NorthPark Center opened in 1965, anchored by Neiman Marcus, Titche-Goettinger and Penneys, other stores included Woolworth's, Doubleday, Kroger, and more. 

The first major expansion happened in 1973 when a new wing opened anchored by Lord & Taylor. 

In early 2004 Lord & Taylor closed after being at the mall for nearly 30 years.

For its first 34 years, NorthPark stood on land leased from the Caruth family's foundation. David and Nancy A. Nasher (Nancy is Raymond's daughter) purchased the property in 1999. In 2006, NorthPark opened to an expansion that more than doubled the size of the existing center, adding an 88,000 sq ft  For its expansion, NorthPark brought back the same architecture firm that designed the original section to ensure its aesthetic was respected and enhanced. The expansion also included a new collection of specialty retail shops and a third-floor 15-screen AMC theater. The two-story expansion provided for circulation around the Center by forming a continuous loop through the complex.

In November 2007, NorthPark Center was named one of the "seven retail wonders of the modern world" along with the Neiman Marcus’ store at Natick Collection in Massachusetts, Japan's Mikimoto store in Ginza, England's Bullring shopping center, Poland's Złote Tarasy in Warsaw, Apple's flagship store in New York City and Italy's Galleria Vittorio Emanuele II .
NorthPark is the home of Texas' first H&M, a fashion label from Sweden. H&M has since opened other locations in Texas.   

The American Film Institute's Dallas International Film Festival was sponsored by NorthPark Center in 2009. The event was held in the AMC NorthPark 15 Theater, which also hosted screenings during the festival's first two years.  

Barneys New York closed in April 2012 after facing fierce competition from other luxury retailers after it opened in 2006. The space is currently split between different stores most notably Arhaus which opened in 2014 and Eataly which opened in December 2020.

Northpark Mall has a currency exchange at Travelex and tax free shopping with Texas sales tax refunds at TaxFree Shopping Ltd.

Art in the mall

NorthPark Center was designed to include art as integral part of its interior landscape. NorthPark received the American Institute of Architects Award for "Design of the Decade - 1960s" as one of the first commercial centers in the United States to create space for the display of fine art.

Architecture

NorthPark Center was designed by Omniplan in the early 1960s. For its recent expansion, NorthPark's owners returned to the architectural firm responsible for the 1960s design.  The expansion turned NorthPark's original U-shape into a square design surrounding a  landscaped garden known as "CenterPark."  Featuring a series of lawns, 41-year-old live oaks and red oaks, seasonal flowers, crushed granite walkways, and a small collection of art, CenterPark doubles as a park area for visitors and customers.

NorthPark Center received both the Texas Society of Architects' annual Design Award and the 25-year Design Award in 2007 for the original design.

Public library
NorthPark Center hosts Bookmarks, a  Dallas Public Library for children 12 years and younger.  Bookmarks is the first children's library in the United States to be in a shopping center.

Location
The Center is at the intersection of the Central Expressway and Loop 12/Northwest Highway, located to the east and south of the center respectively. NorthPark is also across the freeway from The Shops at Park Lane, a mixed-use development with which includes shopping. NorthPark Center is the most popular shopping center in North Texas, with over 27 million visitors a year.

Television and film location
NorthPark's interior has been a location for scenes in television and film productions.

Dr. T and the Women, a  Robert Altman film, has a scene in which the character Kate (Farrah Fawcett) visits stores in the area of the Neiman Marcus court, then is seen around the Dillard's court fountain—which she eventually finds herself in, frolicking and splashing in the buff.

True Stories, a 1986 movie co-starring David Byrne, with one scene of a fashion show held at a mall in Virgil, Texas (the movie's fictional setting) during a town celebration; the interior portion of the scene was filmed in a mid-court area between Neiman Marcus and Dillard's. Byrne and co-star John Goodman were also filmed walking down one of the mall's corridors. 

When the mall reopened in 2006, The Dallas Observer used the mall's ambiance as documented in the film as a source of comparison. "The place looks like a tricked-out spaceship compared to the stark, cold NorthPark in which True Stories was filmed exactly 20 years ago. It looks like the old NorthPark—damned if you can tell difference between the old bricks and the new ones; this thing looks like it was built in a time machine—yet it's brighter too, a friendlier version of the same ol' place." The exterior of Virgil's mall wasn't of NorthPark—the producers used the outside of the former Big Town Mall in nearby Mesquite.

See also 
List of shopping malls in the Dallas/Fort Worth Metroplex
List of largest shopping malls in the United States

References

External links
NorthPark Center Official Site

Shopping malls in the Dallas–Fort Worth metroplex
Economy of Dallas
Buildings and structures in Dallas
Shopping malls established in 1965
1965 establishments in Texas